Ty Harrelson (born September 22, 1980) is an American-Australian former professional basketball player who played the majority of his career in Germany and Australia. He is the current head coach of SC Rasta Vechta in the German second-tier ProA league.

High school and college career
Harrelson grew up as the son of two college basketball players. Under the guidance of his father, Harrelson had a historic high school career split between Sonora High School and S. H. Rider High School. He scored 2,786 career points, which at the time put him 18th on the all-time Texas scoring list.

Harrelson played his freshman college season at Collin County Community College. He spent his sophomore season in the Lone Star Conference at Cameron University before transferring to Wayland Baptist University. After two colleges in as many seasons, Harrelson finally found a home at Wayland Baptist, where he became one of the best players in program history, turning in two stellar seasons with the Pioneers. In his first season, Harrelson helped the team return to the NAIA National Championships for the first time in a decade. The Pioneers returned the next season and posted another 20-win season. Harrelson earned All-Sooner Athletic Conference honors both seasons, and as a senior in 2003 was voted Wayland's first-ever NAIA First-Team All-American. For his two-season WBU career, he scored 1,111 points, tying him for 28th on the Pioneers' all-time points list. Harrelson still holds school records for highest assist average in a season (6.8), most assists in a game (15), and best free-throw percentage in a season (88.8).

Professional career
After leaving college, Harrelson had a short-lived stint in Italy with FuturVirtus Castelmaggiore. After bouncing around Italy and Mexico and playing for the ABA's Fresno Heat Wave in California, Harrelson took a leap of faith and went to Germany for a tryout.

In 2005, Harrelson made his professional debut with German team TV Langen after being offered his first full-year contract. During the 2005–06 season, he led the 2. Basketball Bundesliga in assists with 5.9 per contest. He continued on in Germany for 2006–07 season, joining BBC Bayreuth. Harrelson garnered Eurobasket.com All-2. Bundesliga South Guard of the Year in 2006–07. He had a second season with Bayreuth in 2007–08.

In 2008, Harrelson had two shorts stints with Finnish team Kataja and Hungarian team Falco KC Szombathely.

Harrelson returned to Germany for the 2009–10 season and played with Giro-Live Ballers Osnabrück.

In December 2010, Harrelson signed with the Cockburn Cougars of the State Basketball League. In September 2011, he was named in the SBL All-Star Five.

In December 2011, Harrelson signed with the Goldfields Giants for the 2012 SBL season. In September 2012, he was named in the SBL All-Star Five.

In October 2012, Harrelson signed a three-year deal with the South West Slammers to be player/coach. Despite also being an assistant coach with the Giants, Harrelson said the chance to take on a senior coaching position had been a major drawcard. In September 2013, he was named in the SBL All-Star Five for the third straight year. In October 2014, he committed to the Slammers for the 2015 season after rejecting an offer from the Goldfields Giants. In August 2015, he guided the Slammers to the SBL Grand Final for the first time since 1999, where they were defeated 105–75 by the Joondalup Wolves.

In July 2017, Harrelson had a three-game stint with the Slammers.

Coaching career
On July 11, 2015, Harrelson was hired as head coach of the Wayland Baptist men's basketball program. Under his guidance, the team reached the NAIA national tournament four times. In 2018, Harrelson coached the Wayland Baptist men's basketball team to a NAIA national tournament quarterfinal appearance. After recording 115 wins and 59 losses, he resigned in August 2021.

In early December 2021, he was named head coach of TV Langen in the German Regionalliga, the country's fourth tier.

On June 1st, 2022, Harrelson signed a deal to become the new head coach of SC Rasta Vechta of the German second division, ProA.

References

External links

Wayland Baptist Pioneers coaching profile

1980 births
Living people
American expatriate basketball people in Australia
American expatriate basketball people in Finland
American expatriate basketball people in Germany
American expatriate basketball people in Hungary
American men's basketball players
Basketball players from Texas
Cameron Aggies men's basketball players
Falco KC Szombathely players
Junior college men's basketball players in the United States
Kataja BC players
Medi Bayreuth players
Point guards
SC Rasta Vechta coaches
Shooting guards
Wayland Baptist Pioneers men's basketball players